Lycée Albert Schweitzer may refer to the following French schools:
Lycée Albert Schweitzer - Le Raincy (Paris metropolitan area)
Lycée Albert Schweitzer - Mulhouse